Cedric Cox (born 19 August 1997) is a professional Australian rules footballer who last played for the Brisbane Lions in the Australian Football League (AFL).

AFL career

He was drafted by the Brisbane Lions with their fourth selection and twenty-fourth overall in the 2016 national draft. He made his debut in the fifty-two point loss against  at the Gabba in round four of the 2017 season. On 24 May 2017, it was announced that he would wear number 67 on his jersey, rather than his usual 20, for the round 10 Sir Doug Nicholls Indigenous Round game against . This was to commemorate the 1967 referendum (which allowed Indigenous Australians to be counted with the general population in the census and thus be treated separately in legislation). However, he was not picked to play in the game. 

After the conclusion of the 2020 AFL season, Cox requested a trade to Western Australia but was delisted by the Lions.

Statistics
 Statistics are correct to 2020

|-
! scope="row" style="text-align:center" | 2017
|style="text-align:center;"|
| 20 || 8 || 1 || 0 || 46 || 45 || 91 || 25 || 19 || 0.1 || 0.0 || 5.7 || 5.7 || 11.4 || 3.1 || 2.4
|- style="background:#eaeaea;"
! scope="row" style="text-align:center" | 2018
|style="text-align:center;"|
| 20 || 4 || 2 || 0 || 15 || 25 || 40 || 8 || 7 || 0.5 || 0.0 || 3.7 || 6.2 || 10.0 || 2.0 || 1.8
|-
! scope="row" style="text-align:center" | 2019
|style="text-align:center;"|
| 20 || 1 || - || - || 6 || 3 || 9 || 4 || 2 || - || - || 6.0 || 3.0 || 9.0 || 4.0 || 2.0
|- style="background:#eaeaea;"
! scope="row" style="text-align:center" | 2020
|style="text-align:center;"|
| 20 || - || - || - || - || - || - || - || - || - || - || - || - || - || - || -
|- class="sortbottom"
! colspan=3| Career
! 13
! 3
! 0
! 67
! 73
! 140
! 37
! 28
! 0.2
! 0.0
! 5.15
! 5.62
! 10.77
! 2.85
! 2.15
|}

References

External links

1997 births
Living people
Brisbane Lions players
Greater Western Victoria Rebels players
Australian rules footballers from Western Australia
Indigenous Australian players of Australian rules football